Juan Manual Martínez de Manzanillo, O.P. (died 1592) was a Roman Catholic prelate who served as Bishop of Coro (1583–1592).

Biography
Juan Manual Martínez de Manzanillo was ordained a priest in the Order of Preachers.
On 23 March 1583, he was appointed during the papacy of Pope Gregory XIII as Bishop of Coro.
He served as Bishop of Coro until his death on 1 January 1592.

References

External links and additional sources
 (for Chronology of Bishops) 
 (for Chronology of Bishops) 

16th-century Roman Catholic bishops in Venezuela
Bishops appointed by Pope Gregory XIII
1592 deaths
Dominican bishops
Roman Catholic bishops of Coro